Nothing Has Changed is a 2014 compilation album by David Bowie.

Nothing Has Changed may also refer to:

 "Nothing Has Changed", 1978 song by Shirley
 "Nothing Has Changed", 1991 song by Galliano
 "Nothing Has Changed", 1999 song by Digital Underground from The Lost Files
 "Nothing Has Changed", 2008 song by Paperdoll from Ballad Nerd Pop
 Nothing Has Changed, 1975 poetry collection by Kenneth Patchen
 Nothing Has Changed, 1981 poetry collection by Rosmarie Waldrop

See also
 Nothing's Changed (disambiguation)